Lambent Material is the first album from Portland, Oregon ambient musician Matthew Cooper, under the name Eluvium. Emily Wahl plays clarinet on "There Wasn't Anything". All other instruments on the album played by Cooper.

Track listing
 "The Unfinished" - 4:38
 "Under the Water It Glowed" - 5:09
 "There Wasn't Anything" - 4:40
 "Zerthis Was a Shivering Human Image" - 15:35
 "I Am So Much More Me That You Are Perfectly You" - 5:49

References

2003 debut albums
Eluvium (musician) albums
Temporary Residence Limited albums